is a city located in Osaka Prefecture, Japan. , the city had an estimated population of 263,436 in 126509 households and a population density of 6300 persons per km². The city is the birthplace of the Kawachi ondo style of folk singing.

Geography
Yao is locate adjacent to the central part of the Osaka Plain and southeast of Osaka metropolis. The west side of the city area is almost flat with an average elevation of only ten meters above sea level. The land rises in the east, with the Ikoma Mountains forming the prefectural border with Nara Prefecture. In addition to the Yamato River flowing at the southern end of the city, there are many small rivers.

Neighboring municipalities
Osaka Prefecture
Hirano-ku, Osaka
 Higashiōsaka
 Kashiwara
 Fujiidera
 Matsubara
Nara Prefecture
Heguri
Sangō

Climate
Yao has a Humid subtropical climate (Köppen Cfa) characterized by warm summers and cool winters with light to no snowfall.

Demographics
Per Japanese census data, the population of Yao increased rapidly from the 1960s through 1970s, and has leveled off since.

History

Premodern
The area of the modern city of Yao was within ancient Kawachi Province and is built on land which was once Kawachi Bay. This area was a fertile delta along Old-Yamato River, and has been cultivated since Yayoi period. In the Kofun period, many powerful clans settled here and built kofun burial mounds in the foothills of the Ikoma mountain range. In Asuka period, this area was under the control of Mononobe clan. The clan was destroyed when Mononobe no Moriya was defeated by Soga no Umako. The Yuge clan, which was a cadet branch of Mononobe clan, however, kept control on the area. The monk Dōkyō, who was from Yuge clan, became the most powerful person in the late Nara period through his relationship with Empress Shōtoku. He constructed Saikyo (West Capital) called Yuge-gu in this area, from which he intended rule the nation prior to his fall from power. Takayasu Castle, an ancient castle on Mount Takayasu, was constructed for defense against Tang dynasty, after Yamato was defeated at the Battle of Baekgang in Korean Peninsula and rediscovered by archaeologists in 1978. During the Nara period, the area Yao prospered as a transportation hub between Yamato Province, Naniwa-kyō and the seacoast. During the Heian period, the area was dominated by large shōen landed estates controlled by Buddhist temples and the nobility. In the Sengoku period the area was the site of several battles, including during  the summer campaign of Siege of Osaka.

Before the middle term of Edo period, the Yamato river flowed from south to north and joined to the Yodo River. However, due to flooding, the Tokugawa shogunate undertook a large public works project to change the flow of the Yamato River from east to west, to empty into Osaka Bay directly. The construction decreased number of floods, and enabled this area to develop more paddy fields. In addition, cotton cultivation flourished in this area.

Modern
After the Meiji restoration, the area became part of Osaka Prefecture. The village Yao created with the establishment of the modern municipalities system on April 1, 1889, although the name "Yao" appears as far back as Heian period documents. On April 1, 1896 the area became part of Nakakawachi District, Osaka. Yao was elevated to town status on August 1, 1903. On April 1, 1948, Yao merged with the town of Ryuge and the villages of  Kyuhoji, Taisho, and Nishigo to form the city of Yao.

Government
Yao has a mayor-council form of government with a directly elected mayor and a unicameral city council of 28 members. Yao contributes three members to the Osaka Prefectural Assembly. In terms of national politics, the city is part of Osaka 14th district of the lower house of the Diet of Japan.

Economy
Yao is traditionally known for its production of toothbrushes, and still accounts for 40% of the Japanese market, although the contribution of toothbrush manufacturing to the total local economy is very small. The city is now known as a center for light and medium manufacturing.

Companies based on Yao
 Hosiden (ホシデン株式会社)
 Miki House (ミキハウス)

Education

Colleges and universities
 Osaka University of Economics and Law

Primary and secondary education

Yao has 28 public elementary schools, 15 public middle schools and four public high schools operated by the Osaka Prefectural Department of Education. There is also one private middle school and one private high school. The prefecture also operates on special education school for the handicapped. 

Prefectural senior high schools
 Osaka Prefectural Yao High School (大阪府立八尾高等学校)
 Osaka Prefectural Yaokita High School (大阪府立八尾北高等学校)
 Osaka Prefectural Yamamoto High School (大阪府立山本高等学校)
 Osaka Prefectural Yaosuisho High School (大阪府立八尾翠翔高等学校)

Private junior and senior high school
 Konko Yao Junior and Senior High School (金光八尾中学校・高等学校)

Special needs education
 Osaka Prefectural Yao School for Special Needs Education (大阪府立八尾支援学校)

Transportation

Airports
Yao Airport

Railway
 JR West – Yamatoji Line
 -  -  
 JR West – Osaka Higashi Line
 
 Kintetsu Railway -    Kintetsu Osaka Line
  -  -  -  - 
 Kintetsu Railway -    Kintetsu Shigi Line
  -  
 Kintetsu Railway -    Nishi-Shigi Cable Line
  
  Osaka Metro -   Tanimachi Line:

Highway

Local attractions 
Taiseishōgun-ji, Buddhist temple founded in 587 AD
Shionjiyama Kofun, National Historic Site
Takayasu Senzuka Kofun Cluster, National Historic Site
Yuge-dera ruins, National Historic Site

Sister and Friendship cities 
  Usa, Ōita
  Wake, Okayama
  Shingu, Wakayama
  Gojo, Nara
  Bellevue, Washington, U.S. - Sister city agreement concluded in 1969
  Jiading District, Shanghai, China - Sister city agreement concluded in 1986

Notable people from Yao
Shōgo Arai, politician, governor of Nara Prefecture
Dōkyō, Buddhist monk
Toyokawa Etsushi, actor
Kawachiya Kikusuimaru, musician
Masumi Kuwata, former baseball player
Yasuji Hondo, former baseball player
Hideaki Ikematsu, former football player
Ryota Katayose, singer, vocalist of Generations from Exile Tribe
Kawachiya Kikusuimaru, singer of Kawachi ondo
Masato Kitano, songwriter of Day After Tomorrow
Masumi Kuwata, former baseball player
Ichirō Matsui, politician, mayor of Osaka City
Takashi Miike, film director
Masataka Nishimoto, football player for Cerezo Osaka
Tokushichi Nomura II, Businessman, founder of the Nomura zaibatsu
Tadashi Ōishi, shogi player
Kosuke Okanishi, football player Ventforet Kofu
Yui Okada, singer
Jimmy Onishi, painter and comedian
Noboru Rokuda, manga artist
Nagisa Sakurauchi, football player for Júbilo Iwata
Shota Shimizu, singer
Hitoshi Taneda, former baseball player
Takeshi Tokuda, politician of House of Representatives
Etsushi Toyokawa, actor
Shouma Yamamoto, actor
Tawa (Lemming) Kazue, painter artist

References

External links

 Yao City official website 
 Yao Monozukuri Net is the place to search and contact for manufacturing businesses in Yao City

 
Cities in Osaka Prefecture